Sakman Maluwa (Pleasure Garden) is a 2003 Sri Lankan Sinhala drama film directed by Sumitra Peries and produced by Ceylon Theatres, the oldest cinema production company in Asia. It stars Sanath Gunathilake, Kanchana Mendis and newcomer Dinidu Jagoda in lead roles along with Iranganie Serasinghe and Daya Tennakoon. Music composed by W. D. Amaradeva. The film received mostly positive reviews from critics. It is the 1023rd Sri Lankan film in the Sinhala cinema.

Initially titled as Samanala Uyana by director, popular poet Arisen Ahubudu found that the name was inauspicious. In December 2003, a book titled “Lankeeya Cinemawe Sakman Maluwa” was published by young film critique, Ajith Galappaththi on the film to celebrate 75th anniversary of Ceylon Theatres. The film was screened at Fukoka International Film Festival, Japan in 2004.

Plot

Cast
 Sanath Gunathilake as Tissa
 Vasanthi Chathurani
 Kanchana Mendis as Prema
 Iranganie Serasinghe as Tissa's mother
 Daya Thennakoon as Gardener
 Rangana Premaratne
 Dinidu Jagoda as Ranjan

References

2003 films
2000s Sinhala-language films